Edward Pierce may refer to:
 Edward Pierce (priest) (1630/31–1694), Welsh Anglican priest and writer
 Edward Pierce (sculptor) (1630-1695) English sculptor who created the interior for many of Christopher Wren's churches
 Edward A. Pierce (1874–1974), American businessman and founder of E.A. Pierce & Co. (predecessor of Merrill Lynch)
 Edward C. Pierce (1930–2002), American politician
 Edward L. Pierce (1829–1897), American author
 Edward Pierce (Massachusetts judge)
 Ed Pierce (baseball) (born 1968), former Major League Baseball pitcher
 Ted Pierce (Edward John Pierce, born 1933), Australian triple Olympic water polo player
 Tedd Pierce (Edward Stacey Pierce III), screenwriter of American animated cartoons

In fiction
 Edward Pierce, the protagonist of the novel The Great Train Robbery by Michael Crichton

See also
Edward Pearce (disambiguation)